Sasabe or Sasave may refer to the following:

Places and jurisdictions 
In Europe
 Sasabe, Aragon, a former town and bishopric in Aragon, Spain, now a Latin Catholic titular see
 the Monastery of San Adrián de Sasabe, which remains there

In the Americas
 Sasabe, Arizona, a US town notable for:
 Sasabe Port of Entry 
 El Sásabe, Sonora, in Mexico, across the Arizona homonym

In Asia
 Sasabe Station (笹部駅, Sasabe-eki?), a train station in Kawanishi, Hyōgo Prefecture, Japan

People with the surname 
 Kiyoshi Sasabe (佐々部 清), Japanese film director

Japanese-language surnames